The Hui'an dialect, is a variety of Chinese mostly spoken in Hui'an in South Fujian Province, China. It belongs to the Hokkien subgroup of Southern Min.

Phonology
The Hui'an dialect has 14 phonemic initials and over 80 finals.

Consonants

The phoneme  may be treated as a plosive, i.e. .

Finals

Grammar
The demonstrative system has five pairs of pronouns with a two-way distinction:

Comparison with other varieties of Hokkien

Compared with the Quanzhou dialect (spoken in the central urban area of Quanzhou city), the greatest differences are present in the rimes:

Notes

References
 
 
 
 

Hokkien-language dialects
Quanzhou